Elections to the United States House of Representatives were held in Pennsylvania on October 12, 1802, for the 8th Congress.

Background
In the previous election, 13 Representatives (10 Democratic-Republicans and 3 Federalists) had been elected to the 7th Congress.  Two (both Democratic-Republicans) had resigned and were replaced in special elections by others of the same party.

Congressional districts
Pennsylvania gained 5 seats in reapportionment following the 1800 census.  In redistricting, the number of districts was reduced from 12 to 11, of which four were plural districts with 11 Representatives between them.  Most of the new districts had borders that were very different from the previous districts.  The new districts were as follows:
The  (3 seats) consisted of Delaware and Philadelphia counties (including the City of Philadelphia)
The  (3 seats) consisted of Bucks, Luzerne, Montgomery, Northampton, and Wayne Counties
The  (3 seats) consisted of Berks, Chester, and Lancaster Counties
The  (2 seats) consisted of Cumberland, Dauphin, Huntingdon, and Mifflin Counties
The  consisted of Centre, Lycoming, and Northumberland Counties
The  consisted of Adams and York Counties
The  consisted of Bedford and Franklin Counties
The  consisted of Armstrong, Somerset, and Westmoreland Counties
The  consisted of Fayette and Greene Counties
The  consisted of Washington County
The  consisted of Allegheny, Beaver, Butler, Crawford, Erie, Mercer, Venango, and Warren Counties

Numerous counties had been created between 1800 and 1802 split off from other counties, and several were still administratively attached to other counties.

Note: Many of these counties covered much larger areas than they do today, having since been divided into smaller counties

Election results
Twelve incumbents (9 Democratic-Republicans and 3 Federalists) ran for re-election, many in new districts. William Jones (DR) of the  did not run for re-election.  Of those who ran for re-election, all 9 Democratic-Republicans were re-elected, and all 3 Federalists lost to Democratic-Republicans.  The six open seats were all won by Democratic-Republicans, returning an all-Democratic-Republican delegation to the 8th Congress.

Special election
William Hoge (DR) of the  resigned October 15, 1804.  A special election was held November 2, 1804 to fill the resulting vacancy

John Hoge was William's brother.

References
Electoral data are from the Wilkes University Election Statistics Project

1802
Pennsylvania
United States House of Representatives